Alcolea is a municipality in the province of Almería, Andalusia, Spain.

Alcolea may also refer to:

Places
Alcolea de Cinca, a municipality in the province of Huesca, Aragon, Spain
Alcolea del Río, a municipality in the province of Seville, Andalusia, Spain
Alcolea del Pinar, a municipality in the province of Guadalajara, Castile-La Mancha, Spain
Alcolea de las Peñas, a municipality in the province of Guadalajara, Castile-La Mancha, Spain
Alcolea de Tajo, a municipality in the province of Toledo, Castile-La Mancha, Spain
Alcolea de Calatrava, a municipality in the province of Ciudad Real, Castile-La Mancha, Spain
Alcolea, Córdoba, a town in Córdoba municipal term, Andalusia, Spain, where two important battles took place
Battle of Alcolea (1808) 
Battle of Alcolea (1868)
Vilanova d'Alcolea, a municipality in the province of Castelló, Valencian Community, Spain
La Pobla d'Alcolea, a village in the Morella municipal term, Ports, Spain

People with the surname
Arnold Alcolea (born 1982), Cuban cyclist
Pablo Alcolea (born 1989), Spanish footballer